Chrośnica  is a village in the administrative district of Gmina Zbąszyń, within Nowy Tomyśl County, Greater Poland Voivodeship, in west-central Poland.

The village has a population of 544.

References

Villages in Nowy Tomyśl County